Sar Zeh is a village in Mosaferabad Rural District, Rudkhaneh District, Rudan County, Hormozgan Province, Iran. At the 2006 census, its population was 314, in 71 families.

References 

Populated places in Rudan County